The 1883 Ontario general election was the fifth general election held in the Province of Ontario, Canada, to elect the 88 Members of the 5th Legislative Assembly of Ontario ("MLAs"). Held on February 27, 1883, the fifth Ontario provincial election was the only one ever contested in the month of February.

The Ontario Liberal Party, led by Oliver Mowat, won a fourth consecutive term in government, despite losing nine seats in the Legislature.

The Ontario Conservative Party, led by William Ralph Meredith, won eight additional seats.

Results

See also
Politics of Ontario
List of Ontario political parties
Premier of Ontario
Leader of the Opposition (Ontario)

References

1883
1883 elections in Canada
February 1883 events
1883 in Ontario